Love, Latest Model (Spanish language: Amor último modelo) is a 1942 Argentine comedy film directed by Roberto Ratti and written by Ariel Cortazzo and Conrado de Koller. The film starred Hugo del Carril.

Cast
Rufino Córdoba
Adrián Cuneo
Hugo del Carril
Susy del Carril
Mercedes Díaz
Amanda Ledesma
Ana María Lynch
Emma Martínez
Bertha Moss
César Ratti
Luis Sandrini
Hilda Sour
Alberto Vila

Release
The film premiered in Argentina on 4 October 1942.

External links

1942 films
1940s Spanish-language films
Argentine black-and-white films
1942 comedy films
Argentine comedy films
1940s Argentine films